Inkster can refer to:

Places
Inkster, Michigan, United States
Inkster, North Dakota, United States
Inkster (electoral district), Manitoba, Canada

People
Colin Inkster, (1843 - 1934) Manitoba politician
Dana Inkster, Canadian artist and filmmaker 
George T. Inkster, (1841 - 1901) American pioneer
Ian Inkster, writer and technological historian
John Inkster, (1799 - 1874) Manitoba pioneer, politician, and merchant
John Scott Inkster, (1924-2011) Scots anesthesiologist
Juli Inkster, professional golfer
Nigel Inkster, former deputy director of MI6
Norman Inkster, 18th Commissioner of the Royal Canadian Mounted Police from 1987 to 1994